Here Comes Mr. Jordan is a 1941 American fantasy romantic comedy film directed by Alexander Hall, in which a boxer, mistakenly taken to Heaven before his time, is given a second chance back on Earth. It stars Robert Montgomery, Claude Rains and Evelyn Keyes.

The film script, based on Harry Segall's 1938 play Heaven Can Wait (originally called It was Like This), was written by Sidney Buchman and Seton I. Miller. The working titles for the film were Heaven Can Wait and Mr. Jordan Comes to Town. In 1943 the title Heaven Can Wait was used for another unrelated comedy about the afterlife.

Edward Everett Horton reprised his role as Messenger 7013 and Roland Culver took on the role of Mr Jordan in the film's sequel Down to Earth (1947). Warren Beatty later remade the film in 1978 as Heaven Can Wait. The 2001 film Down to Earth, starring Chris Rock, is also based on the play.

Columbia was planning to release Here Comes Mr. Jordan on VHS and Betamax in November 1979 as one of Columbia Pictures Home Entertainment's launch titles, but for business reasons they did not release the film on home video until 1982. It was restored and released on DVD and Blu-ray by The Criterion Collection in 2016.

Plot
On May 11, 1941, boxer and amateur pilot Joe Pendleton, affectionately known as "the Flying Pug", flies his small aircraft to his next fight in New York City, but crashes when a control cable severs. His soul is retrieved by 7013, an officious angel who assumed that Joe could not have survived. Joe's manager, Max "Pop" Corkle, has his body cremated. In the afterlife, the records show his death was a mistake; he was supposed to live for 50 more years. The angel's superior, Mr. Jordan, confirms this, but since there is no more body, Joe will have to take over a newly dead corpse. Jordan explains that a body is just something that is worn, like an overcoat; inside, Joe will still be himself. Joe insists that it be someone in good physical shape, because he wants to continue his boxing career.

After Joe turns down several "candidates", Jordan takes him to see the body of a crooked, extremely wealthy banker and investor named Bruce Farnsworth, who has just been drugged and drowned in a bathtub by his wife Julia and his secretary, Tony Abbott. Joe is reluctant to take over a life so unlike his previous one, but when he sees the murderous pair mockingly berating Bette Logan, whose father's name has been misused by Farnsworth to sell worthless securities, he changes his mind and agrees to take over Farnsworth's body.

As Farnsworth, Joe repays all the investors and has Bette's father exonerated. He sends for Corkle and convinces him that he is Joe (by playing his saxophone just as badly as he did in his previous incarnation). With Farnsworth's money to smooth the way, Corkle trains him and arranges a bout to decide who will next fight the current heavyweight champion, but Jordan returns to warn Joe that, while he is destined to be the champion, it cannot happen that way. Joe has just enough time to tell Bette, with whom he has fallen in love, that if a stranger (especially if he is a boxer) approaches her, to give him a chance. Then he is shot by Tony. While Joe returns to a ghostly existence, Farnsworth's body is hidden, with everyone believing Farnsworth has simply disappeared. Corkle hires a private investigator to find him.

Accompanied by Jordan, Joe goes to retrieve his lucky saxophone he left on Farnsworth's piano and finds the police conducting a group interrogation. Corkle, talking to himself, wanders the room looking for Joe or Jordan. Corkle has explained about Joe, Mr. Jordan and the body-switching, to the police detective (Donald MacBride) who thinks he is a nut. Joe manages to mentally nudge Corkle into turning on the radio to hear the championship fight and hears that Murdock has collapsed from a slight grazing punch. Jordan reveals that the boxer was shot by gamblers because he refused to throw the fight. Joe takes over Murdock's body and wins the title. Back at the mansion, Corkle hears one of the radio announcers mention a saxophone hanging by the ringside and seeing the saxophone gone from the room, realizes Joe has assumed Murdock's body.

Corkle races down to the dressing room. There, Joe passes along information from Jordan that Farnsworth's body is in a refrigerator in the basement of the mansion. Corkle tells the detective, who promptly has Julia and Tony arrested. As Murdock, Joe fires his old, crooked manager and hires Corkle. Jordan reveals to Joe that this is his destiny; he can be Murdock and live his life.

Healing the gunshot wound and at the same time removing Joe's memory of his past life, Jordan hangs around for a bit longer until Bette arrives. She wanted to see Corkle, but runs into Murdock instead. The pair feel they have met before. The two go off together, while Jordan smiles and says "So long, champ."

Cast
 Robert Montgomery as Joe Pendleton
 Evelyn Keyes as Bette Logan
 Claude Rains as Mr. Jordan
 Rita Johnson as Julia Farnsworth
 Edward Everett Horton as Messenger 7013
 James Gleason as Max "Pop" Corkle
 John Emery as Tony Abbott
 Donald MacBride as Insp. Williams
 Don Costello as Lefty
 Halliwell Hobbes as Sisk
 Benny Rubin as "Bugsy" (the handler)
 Lloyd Bridges as Mr. Sloan, the co-pilot
 Eddie Bruce as Reporter
 John Ince as Bill Collector
 Bert Young as Taxi Driver
 Warren Ashe as Charlie
 Ken Christy as Plainclothesman
 Chester Conklin as Newsboy
 Joseph Crehan as Doctor
 Mary Currier as Secretary
 Edmund Elton as Elderly man
 Tom Hanlon as Announcer
 Bobby Larson as "Chips"
 Heinie Conklin as Reporter (uncredited)

Production

Columbia Pictures president Harry Cohn was persuaded to try a somewhat "risky" project in Here Comes Mr. Jordan, despite his well-founded policy of building on past successful ventures, rather than financing more adventurous films. An original 1938 stage play, Heaven Can Wait by Harry Segall, was adapted to form the basis of the film. Broadway producer Jed Harris had planned to produce the play on the New York stage, until Columbia purchased the rights as a vehicle for Cary Grant. While it was still in pre-production, Montgomery was borrowed from Metro-Goldwyn-Mayer to star in the film.

Principal photography began on April 21, 1941, and ran until June 5, 1941. Location shooting took place at Providencia Ranch, California, and on Universal City sound stages.

Reception
Upon Here Comes Mr. Jordan'''s world premiere at Radio City Music Hall, film critic Theodore Strauss of The New York Times noted, "... Columbia has assembled its brightest people for a delightful and totally disarming joke at heaven's expense." He further described the film as, "... gay, witty, tender and not a little wise. It is also one of the choicest comic fantasies of the year."Variety called Montgomery's acting "a highlight in a group of excellent performances" and praised Hall's direction for "expert handling of characters and wringing utmost interest out of every scene."Harrison's Reports wrote, "Here is a picture that is praiseworthy from many angles; for one thing, the theme is novel and the plot developments ingenious; for another, the production values are good, and the acting and direction are of a high standard."

The review in Film Daily opined, "Producer Everett Riskin, noted for his successes in the field of comedy, had no cinch with this property which might easily have backfired with an inexperienced hand at the helm. But Riskin's talent and knowledge has placed this finished product very near the peak of perfection in film making." Here Comes Mr. Jordan placed fifth on the year-end poll of 548 critics nationwide at  Film Daily,  naming it one of the best films of 1941.

Russell Maloney of The New Yorker called the film "one of the brightest comedies of the year ... Mr. Rains' acting is the kind that makes the word 'ham' a word of endearment, and I mean that for a compliment."

The film's premise of a protagonist receiving a second chance through the intervention of angels was imitated throughout the ensuing decade, in the Christmas classic It's a Wonderful Life as well as I Married an Angel, A Guy Named Joe, A Matter of Life and Death and Angels in the Outfield.

Film critic Leonard Maltin noted that Here Comes Mr. Jordan was an "Excellent fantasy-comedy of prizefighter Montgomery accidentally sent to heaven before his time, forced to occupy a new body on earth. Hollywood moviemaking at its best, with first-rate cast and performances."

Awards and honors
Harry Segall won the Academy Award for Best Story, while Sidney Buchman and Seton I. Miller won for Best Screenplay. Nominations included: Best Picture, Montgomery for Best Actor in a Leading Role, Hall for Best Director, Gleason for Best Actor in a Supporting Role and Joseph Walker for Best Cinematography, Black-and-White.Here Comes Mr. Jordan was preserved by the UCLA Film and Television Archive with the cooperation of Columbia Pictures and the Library of Congress.

 Home media Here Comes Mr. Jordan was originally going to be released on VHS and Betamax in November 1979 as one of Columbia Pictures Home Entertainment's launch titles, but because of the financial success of Midnight Express, the release was cancelled and Midnight Express took Here Comes Mr. Jordan's place in the launch lineup. Due to this, Columbia did not release the film on home video until 1982.

In 2016, The Criterion Collection released a fully restored version of the movie on DVD and Blu-ray.

Remakes
On January 26, 1942, Claude Rains, Evelyn Keyes and James Gleason reprised their roles in a Lux Radio Theatre broadcast with Cary Grant, the original choice for the lead role, co-starring. Here Comes Mr. Jordan was remade as Heaven Can Wait (1978), starring Warren Beatty, Buck Henry and Julie Christie. Ice Angel, a 2000 film for Fox Family starring Nicolle Tom and Tara Lipinski remade it with the "twist" that it was an adult male hockey player who was forced to take over the body of a teenaged female figure skater. Down to Earth (2001), sharing the title with the sequel to Here Comes Mr. Jordan, starred Chris Rock. Jhuk Gaya Aasman (English: The Skies Have Bowed) (1968) was an Indian Hindi remake of Here Comes Mr. Jordan. Punjabi movie Mar Gaye Oye Loko is also inspired from Here Comes Mr. Jordan. A pornographic remake, Debbie Does Dallas ... Again (which reimagines the person taken too soon as the lead character from Debbie Does Dallas), was released in 2007.

In other media
In Road to Morocco, one of Bob Hope's characters, the deceased Aunt Lucy, comes to him in a dream but then cuts it short, saying "Here comes Mr. Jordan," a homage to the movie of the same name.

See also
 List of films about angels

Notes

References

Bibliography

 Maltin, Leonard. Leonard Maltin's Movie Guide 2009. New York: New American Library, 2009 (originally published as TV Movies, then Leonard Maltin’s Movie & Video Guide''), First edition 1969, published annually since 1988. .

External links
 
 
 
 
 
Here Comes the Angel of Death an essay by Farran Smith Nehme at the Criterion Collection
 Here Comes Mr. Jordan on Lux Radio Theater: January 26, 1942

1941 films
1940s sports comedy films
1940s fantasy comedy films
1941 romantic comedy films
American fantasy comedy films
American romantic comedy films
American romantic fantasy films
American aviation films
American black-and-white films
American boxing films
Columbia Pictures films
Films about angels
Films about the afterlife
Films about reincarnation
Films directed by Alexander Hall
Films scored by Friedrich Hollaender
Films set in New York City
Films that won the Academy Award for Best Story
Films whose writer won the Best Adapted Screenplay Academy Award
Films with screenplays by Sidney Buchman
Films adapted into radio programs
1940s English-language films
1940s American films